The Seitengewehr 98 (literally meaning 'Sidearm'), also known as the "Butcher's Blade", is a bayonet used with the Gewehr 98 rifle by Germany. It was designed in response to the French Épée-Baïonnette Modèle 1886.

Description 
The Seitengewehr 98 is a bayonet that accompanies the Gewehr 98, a German bolt-action rifle made by Mauser. It was superseded by the short-lived Seitengewehr 98/02, with a shorter and sturdier 44cm blade. Seitengewehr 98/05 followed shortly, with a still-substantial 37cm blade. All Mauser bayonets attached via a T-shaped bar fitted under the barrel. Although many bayonets of the time used a muzzle ring, Mauser avoided one since these altered the vibration harmonics of the barrel when fired, affecting accuracy. All the bayonets featured quillons that curved back towards the hilt. These were much less effective at catching the opposing blade than the forward-swept quillons used by some other nations. A small number of pioneers and certain non-commissioned officers of the German Army were issued a bayonet with a sawback edge, known as the S or m.S. ("mit Säge", with saw). Many such bayonets had their teeth ground down in response to negative Allied propaganda.

The first model had a grip made of one single piece of wood, which was wrapped around the tang. This was called a.A. which means in German “alter Art” (old type). At the turn of the century the Germans simplified and strengthened their bayonet grips. The new type is called n.A. (neu Art) and the grip was made of two halves from wood. The two-piece grips were introduced in 1902.

References 

Bayonets
World War I German infantry weapons